= HMPO-DAPy =

Names
- Preferred IUPAC name [({(2R)-1-[(2,6-Diaminopyrimidin-4-yl)oxy]-3-hydroxypropan-2-yl}oxy)methyl]phosphonic acid

Identifiers
3D model (JSmol)	Interactive image
ChEMBL	ChEMBL265719
ChemSpider	4980893
PubChem CID	6480061
CompTox Dashboard (EPA)	DTXSID501028046
- InChI: InChI=1S/C8H15N4O6P/c9-6-1-7(12-8(10)11-6)17-3-5(2-13)18-4-19(14,15)16/h1,5,13H,2-4H2,(H2,14,15,16)(H4,9,10,11,12)/t5-/m1/s1 Key: SDORNFBUOMQVCA-RXMQYKEDSA-N
- SMILES: C1=C(N=C(N=C1OC[C@@H](CO)OCP(=O)(O)O)N)N

Properties
Chemical formula	C_{8}H_{15}N_{4}O_{6}P
Molar mass	294.204 g·mol^{−1}
- Except where otherwise noted, data are given for materials in their standard state (at 25 °C [77 °F], 100 kPa). Infobox references

HMPO-DAPy is an experimental antiviral drug.
